One Million Star is a television singing competition in Taiwan broadcast on China Television (CTV). It debuted on 5 January 2007, filling the 10pm to midnight time slot on Friday evenings. The show is hosted by Tao Ching-Ying (陶晶瑩) and is currently shown on Sundays from 8 to 10pm. The aim of the show is to gather talented young singers and find the one who has the best qualities to become a superstar. One Million Star launched the music careers of Mandopop artists such as Yoga Lin, Aska Yang, Wong JingLun and Jam Hsiao.

In its debut year the show won Best Variety Programme and Best Host in a Variety Programme for Tao at the 42nd Golden Bell Awards. and has been nominated for both awards in 2008, 2009 and 2010. In 2011, the program branched out with another edition: Chinese Million Star, featuring contenders from Los Angeles, Malaysia, Singapore and Taiwan trying to make the cut for the preliminary quarter-finals, which take place in Taiwan. The show premiered on July 3, 2011.

Rules
In the early auditions, hopeful contestants are screened by preliminary panels to be selected for singing talent. The audition process is long and highly competitive, with hundreds of candidates eliminated. Once they make it to the show, the contestants face different tasks every week that involve singing; the worst-performing individual is eliminated. The six finalists no longer face elimination, but are graded on their performance each week. The one who excels wins the grand prize: NT$1,000,000 and a studio recording contract.

Season summary

Season 1
The format features five judges who not only critique the contestants' performances but guide them. The three regular judges are songwriter, singer and producer: Wei-Jen Yuan (袁惟仁), Kay Huang (黃韻玲) and famous stylist Roger. There will be two different guest judges every week. Some previous guest judges include famous singers Phil Chang (張宇), Winnie Hsin, 林志炫; producers 小蟲, 王治平; TV producer 王偉忠; entertainers 孫鵬, 郭子乾 and so on.

Season 2
The second season of "One Million Star" begins at the same time 9.30 GMT +8 in Taiwan on July the 20th.

After competition

Awards and nominations

See also
Super Girl
Super Boy
Blossoming Flowers
The Voice
Chinese Million Star

References

External links
  CTV One Million Star homepage
  The First Season
  The Second Season, The Fifth Season & The Sixth Season
  The Third Season & The Fourth Season

Taiwanese reality television series
Singing talent shows
Mandopop